Šoškić is a surname. Notable people with the surname include:

Branislav Šoškić (1922−2022), President of the Socialist Republic of Montenegro (1985−1986)
Budislav Šoškić (1925−1979), President of the People's Assembly of the Socialist Republic of Montenegro (1974−1979)
Dejan Šoškić, Serbian economist
Milutin Šoškić (born 1937–2022), Serbian footballer

Serbian surnames